A precipice is a significant vertical rock exposure.

Precipice may also refer to:

 "Precipice" (Battlestar Galactica), the second episode of the third season of Battlestar Galactica
 "Precipice" (Smallville), the nineteenth episode of the second season of Smallville
 Precipice National Park, a national park in Queensland, Australia
 The Precipice (Goncharov novel), an 1869 novel by Ivan Goncharov
 The Precipice (MacLennan novel), a 1948 novel by Hugh MacLennan
 The Precipice: Existential Risk and the Future of Humanity, a 2020 non-fiction book by Toby Ord
 The Precipice (Bova novel), a 2001 science fiction novel by Ben Bova
 Art Style: precipice, a DSiWare game available for download on the Nintendo DSi